Jesa is a ceremony commonly practiced in the East Asian cultural sphere. Jesa functions as a memorial to the ancestors of the participants. Jesa are usually held on the anniversary of the ancestor's death. The majority of Catholics, Buddhists and nonbelievers practice ancestral rites, although Protestants do not. The Catholic ban on ancestral rituals was lifted in 1939, when Pope Pius XII formally recognized ancestral rites as a civil practice (see Chinese Rites controversy).  Many Korean Christians, particularly Protestants, no longer practice this rite. Christians generally, and Muslims avoid the rites, and many emigrants avoid the rites.

Since their origins, Jesa has taken on a certain formality as human civilization has developed, which is sometimes called rituals in Confucianism.

Origins in Ancient China 

Jesa, 祭祀 (corresponding to English: sacrifice (祭), ritual (祀)) evolved from the ancient Chinese sacrifice ritual, which refers to the use of string incense, wine, water, meat, vegetables, cloth, and jade (a traditional Confucian sacrifice) to the deity, saints or dead souls, prayer.

The noble class during the Shang and Zhou dynasties had a highly structured and hierarchical ritual system that granted them exclusive power to communicate with the gods. Only the king held the authority and means to gather the clans and produce ceremonial vessels, which allowed him to reinforce his legitimacy as ruler. In "Art, Myth, and Sacrifice", author Chang Guang-chih posits that the political power of the ruling class in ancient China was derived from these rituals. These rituals eventually transformed into laws that sustained the stability of society, and the sites where they were performed served as venues for governance, conflict resolution, and legal proceedings. Even after the collapse of the feudal system, the new ruler, the Emperor, continued to perform these rituals.

The objects of sacrifice in the Shang dynasty were natural animism and ancestors of the royal family. Some scholars believe that the concept of a supreme deity did not exist in the primitive polytheistic beliefs of the Shang Dynasty, but the worship of all things was the main focus, and that "God" and "heaven" in the divination were only "The Yin people only worshiped the ancestral gods and natural gods, and did not worship the supreme god, the emperor. Unlike other agricultural civilizations, the Shang dynasty also seldom sacrificed to the sun or the moon, but placed more emphasis on the river gods, throwing sacrifices into the river and drowning them or burying them on the riverbank As for ancestor worship, the royal family believed that ancestors could influence weather, war outcomes and crop harvests. In order to threaten the survival of the country, the ancestors are worshipped and thanksgiving rituals are held when there is a good harvest or when there is a victory. If a member of the royal family does not get along, does not follow ritual norms, breaks taboos or is corrupt in society, he or she may anger the ancestors and cause a natural or man-made disaster, and illness of a member of the royal family is considered a punishment from the ancestors. The royal family also believed that the founder of the dynasty Shang Tang would continue to care for the country after his death, so Shang Tang was often the focus of rituals. Rituals were the main responsibility of the Shang king (who may have controlled a group of professional priests, or may have been a shaman himself). Therefore, the Shang king would hold hunts to obtain resources for rituals and regarded both rituals and war as one of the most important matters. Liu Kang Gong of Eastern Zhou said, "The great matter of the state is the sacrifice and the military", which is the inheritance of the Zhou people's concept of merchants and the norm of the whole pre-Qin society. Many of the achievements of Shang civilization were related to rituals, such as Oracle bone script and ceremonial vessels.

During the Zhou Dynasty, the rituals were divided into the following categories: Taijuan, Shaojuan, special animals, special boars, special dolphins, fish, wax, and beans. Originally, only the Son of Heaven could use the ritual of Taijuan, but since Han Gaozu sacrificed Confucius with the ritual of Taijuan, the modern Confucian rituals also use the Taijuan ceremony. In terms of rituals, from King Wu of the Zhou Dynasty onwards, a special cadastral field was set up to worship the "Heavenly Emperor" and a shrine to the God of the Land was built with chestnut wood to "make the people tremble". These were important manifestations of the Shendao during the Zhou dynasty, and the religion was transformed from its initial primitive nature into an instrument dedicated to the service of the king's power, and was also emulated by later generations such as Sacrifice to Heaven and sacrifice to Taishan, which were exclusively enjoyed by the Son of Heaven.

While Confucianism regards the "Mandate of Heaven" since the Western Zhou as a supreme monolithic cult, the religious beliefs of Moism are closer to the Polytheism before the Western Zhou, under which "heaven", "earth deities (nature gods)" and "human ghosts (ancestral gods)" were worshiped. The religious beliefs of Mohism were closer to the Polytheism before the Western Zhou Dynasty, where "heaven," "earth gods (nature gods)," and "human ghosts (ancestral gods)" coexisted. From the late primitive society to the Shang and Zhou periods, human animals were sometimes used in sacrifices, usually of prisoners of war, and in the Spring and Autumn Warring States period, as social trends changed, The Hundred Schools of Thought almost always criticized the human sacrifice phenomenon of the time. Confucianism advocates the restoration of the sacrificial system of the Zhou dynasty (but not the human sacrifice), which is well studied and documented in Confucian classics such as the Book of Rites, but the purpose has changed from appeasing the ghosts and gods to education of the people and maintaining social order. The purpose of the Shogunate has been changed from appeasing the spirits to education the people and maintaining social order. The Mozi, who inherited the political and religious concepts of the Yinshang, also valued the sacrifice of ghosts and gods (and did not revert to Human sacrifice). For example, Mozi advocated that "the sacrifice of the gods and goddesses should be respected in order to be filial to one's relatives", and "The ghost of man, not man. The ghost of a brother, a brother too. The ghost of a man is not a sacrifice to a man. The ghost of a brother is a sacrifice to a brother." However, in order to avoid wasting social resources, the Mohists advocated saving sacrifices and saving burials.

History in Korea

Prehistoric 
Korean ancestral worship can be traced back to Korean bronze age, as table-top dolmens found in Korean peninsula, Liaodong, and Manchuria were used for ancestral worship among different social groups.

Jecheon event 
The Jecheon event has been inherited from Dangun Joseon to Yeonggo (迎鼓) in Buyeo, Mucheon (舞天) in Dongye, Alliance of Goguryeo (東盟), Jingungjesa (Silla), and Palgwanhoe (八關會) in Goryeo. Up to this point, it was governed by the state. However, when Joseon started paying tribute to China and adopted Confucianism as its ruling ideology, the heavenly culture ceases to exist. After that, King Gojong established Hwangudan (圜丘壇), a celestial altar, and revived the celestial culture. Today's Confucian rituals were introduced from the end of Goryeo. Then, in the early Joseon Dynasty, China 's 'Juju Ga-rye' was accepted and spread gradually, centering on the four majors.

Jesa as national ritual 
In Korea, ancestral rites have been held for the safety and welfare of the country and its people since ancient times. These national ceremonies include ancestral rites and ancestor worship .

The Jecheon event is an event held in heaven, and is held in Yeonggo (迎鼓) in Buyeo, Mucheon (舞天) in Dongye, Alliance of Goguryeo, and in May and October of Samhan . There were ritual ceremonies such as the May Festival and the October Festival. In addition, the Palgwanhoe (八關會) held in Silla and Goryeo and Wonguje (圜丘祭) held in Goryeo and Joseon are also among the festivals of Jecheon.

In addition, ancestor worship continued from ancient times. In Goguryeo, ancestral rites were held to Gojumong and Yuhwa, the founders of the nation, and there was also Dongmyeongmyo in Baekje, which was believed to have diverged from Goguryeo. In Silla, during the reign of King Namhae, Hyukgeosemyo was built. In Goryeo and Joseon, ancestral rites were held to enshrine Dangun, and Jongmyo and Sajik were established respectively to hold ancestral rites for the ancestors of the dynasty. Also, in Joseon, Confucianism was worshiped and a burial site was established, and the rite of munmyo held there was a national rite.

Kinds of ancestor rituals 
There are several kinds of ancestor rituals such as gijesa (기제사, 忌祭祀), charye (차례, 茶禮), seongmyo (성묘, 省墓), and myosa (묘사, 墓祀). Gijesa is a memorial service which is held on the day of the ancestor's death every year. Gijesa is performed until upwards of five generations of ancestors in the eldest descendant's house. Memorial services that are performed on Chuseok or New Year's Day are called "charye". On April 5 and before Chuseok, Koreans visit the tombs of their ancestors and trim the grass off the tombs. Then, they offer food, fruits, and wine, and finally make bows in front of the tombs. Memorial services that are performed in front of tombs are called "seongmyo". Finally Myosa are performed at the tomb site in the lunar month of October to conduct in memory of old ancestors (five or more generations).

Ancestral rites are typically divided into 3 categories:
Charye (차례, 茶禮) – tea rites held 4 times a year on major holidays (Korean New Year, Chuseok)
Gije (기제, 忌祭, also called gijesa) – household rites held the night before or morning of an ancestor's death anniversary (기일, 忌日). 
Sije (시제, 時祭; also called 사시제 or 四時祭) – seasonal rites held for ancestors who are 5 or more generations removed (typically performed annually on the tenth lunar month)

Performance

To perform ancestor rituals, the family at the eldest son's house prepare many kinds of food such as wine, taro soup, beef, fish, three different colored vegetables, many kinds of fruits, and rice cake or songpyon, particularly those that were favored by the deceased. The shinwi (신위, 神位) or memorial tablet, which symbolizes the spiritual presence of the ancestor, is placed at the center of the table. In modern days, the daughter or younger son of the family may perform these rites.

After midnight or in the evening before an ancestor's death anniversary, the descendants set the shrine, with a paper screen facing north and food laid out on a lacquer table as follows: rice, meat, and white fruits on the west, soup, fish, and red fruits on the east, with fruits on the first row, meat and fish on the second, vegetables on the third, and cooked rice and soup on the last. The rice bowls and individual offerings to the male ancestors are placed to the west, and those of females to the east (고서비동, 考西妣東). Two candles are also laid on both ends of the table, and an incense holder is placed in the middle. In front of the shrine, they set up written prayer, if the family does not own a memorial tablet (신위).

A typical rite is generally performed following this sequence:
Kangshin (강신) – Several ritual greetings call the spirits down then follow.
Choheon (초헌, "initial offering") – The eldest male descendant makes the first offering of rice wine, followed by his wife. At the conclusion of the first ritual offering, the eldest son would show his respects by performing a ritual bow twice. The wife bows four times.
Aheon (아헌, "secondary offering") – The second eldest male descendant (typically the next eldest sons or sons-in law) makes an offering of liquor as well.
Jongheon (종헌, "final offering") – The third eldest male descendant (typically the next eldest sons or sons-in law) makes an offering of liquor as well. Offerings are continued to be made until no high-ranking male descendants are left.
Sapsi (삽시, "spoon insertion") – The main course is served by the eldest male descendant, to the memorial tablet, by sticking a spoon into the middle of the rice bowl.
Yushik (유식, "urged meal") – The ancestors receive the offerings and partake in the meal. To do so, participants leave the room, called hapmun (합문, 闔門). Afterward, in gyemun (계문, 啓門) – participants return to the room, after a few minutes. This is signaled by the eldest male descendant clearing his throat twice.
Heonda (헌다, "tea offering") – Tea, brewed from roasted rice is offered to the ancestors.
Cheolsang (철상, "removal of table") – All the attendants at the ceremony bow twice and the spirits are sent off until the next year. The table with the food and wine offerings is then cleared and the written prayer recited earlier on during the ceremony is set a fire.
Eumbok (음복, "drink blessings") – Participants divide the sacrificial offerings and partake in the feast. Consuming the ritual food and wine is considered to be an integral part of the ceremony, as it symbolizes the receiving of the blessings bestowed upon the family.

The altar food may be distributed to neighbors and friends in a Buddhist rite called shishik, which is a form of merit-making that, along with sutra reading and intoning of Buddha's teachings, expedities the deceased spirit's entry into Sukhavati.

Modern ancestor rituals 
Ancestor worship has significantly changed in recent years. These days it is common to hold ancestor rituals up to only two generations of ancestors, and in some cases, people only hold rituals for their dead parents. In addition, more people are holding rituals in the evening, not after midnight. People can also perform ancestor rituals in a younger son's house.

Today, in most Korean families, ancestor rituals still remain an important part of their culture and they are faithfully observed. These ancestor rituals, in spite of revised form, continue to play an important part in modern Korean society, which testifies to their inherent importance in the lives of Koreans.

Heotjesatbap 
In Andong during the Joseon Dynasty, it was common for jesa foods to be eaten rather than used in the ceremony. Such meals were called heotjesatbap or "fake jesa food." The most common dish was a special type of bibimbap mixed with soy sauce (ganjang) instead of the more commonly used hot pepper paste gochujang. They were a common late-night snack for yangban scholars known as Seonbi, and many restaurants in Andong still serve heotjesatbap today.

Gallery

See also
Merit-making
Chinese ancestral worship
Ancestral tablet
Death anniversary
Jangnye
Chinese Rites Controversy
Parentalia, similar rites in ancient Rome
Veneration of the dead
Folk religion
 Festival
 Matsuri
 Sacrifice to Heaven
 Filial mourning
 Śrāddha
 Jecheon event
 Omiki

References

External links
拜拜小百科

Spiritual practice
Cultural anthropology
Folklore studies
Ritual
Korean Confucianism
Observances honoring the dead
Religious Confucianism